Boris Fyodorovich Budnikov  (born February 16, 1942) is a
Soviet sailor. He won the silver medal in  Soling in the 1980 Summer Olympics in Moscow along with Alexandr Budnikov and Nikolay Poliakov.

References

1942 births
Living people
Russian male sailors (sport)
Olympic sailors of the Soviet Union
Olympic silver medalists for the Soviet Union
Olympic bronze medalists for the Soviet Union
Soviet male sailors (sport)
Olympic medalists in sailing
Sailors at the 1972 Summer Olympics – Star
Sailors at the 1976 Summer Olympics – Soling
Sailors at the 1980 Summer Olympics – Soling
Medalists at the 1980 Summer Olympics
European Champions Soling